Jaani Peuhu (born 17 August 1978) is a Finnish musician, producer and songwriter. He is the founder and lead vocalist of the Finnish band Iconcrash and currently working with his debut solo album. He currently resides in Helsinki.

Background 
Peuhu was born in Anjalankoski to a jazz musician father, Kari Peuhu, and a photographer mother, Heli Ahoniitty. At the age of seven, he began his musical career when he started playing the piano; one year later he learned to play the drums.
At the age of 13 he formed his first band Chaoslord. He played his first show in Ruovesi one year later at the age of 14.

Peuhu has played drums in several bands including Scarlet Youth, Varjo, Deadbabes, Myyt, Mary-Ann, Billy-Goats, Jalankulkuämpäri, Kinetic and Vuk.

Jaani started his solo career in 2004, when he created his first record as a singer/songwriter under the name Iconcrash. Jaani has also worked in the studio as a producer or guest musician with artists like Before the Dawn (band), Swallow The Sun, To/Die/For, Thunderstone, Wiidakko and Anna Eriksson.

More recently, he produced Rain Diary's 'The Lights are Violent Here' album, which was voted #1 Alternative debut album for 2013, in a polling held by Levykauppa Äx.

Since Iconcrash's first release "Nude" (2005) Peuhu has toured with his live band in the UK, Finland, Russia, Germany, Italy, the Baltic States and the US.
In September/October 2014, he toured Germany and Finland as part of the 'Finnish Darkwave Tour' along with fellow Artists Rain Diary.

In September 2012 Jaani Peuhu announced his solo career under his own name.  He released his album 'Tear Catcher' in January 2015.  Apart from the song 'Maybe God is Asleep' all music and lyrics were written by Peuhu.  Also, apart from mixing on 'My Sky' the album was produced, engineered and mixed by Peuhu.

Prior to the release of 'Tear Catcher' Peuhu released an EP of cover versions in December 2014, entitled 'Echo Chamber'.

Awards 
2012 Iconcrash's We Are The Night made it is UMK finals (ESC) and
in 2009 Jaani Peuhu co-wrote a song called "10,000 Light Years" for the band Kwan with Pauli Rantasalmi of The Rasmus, that made it to the Eurovision Song Contest finals in Finland.

Discography 
Mary-Ann
 1998 MCD: Deeper Sin

Billy-Goats
 1999 MCD: All These Fears

Jalankulkuämpäri
 2002 CDS: TIP
 2003 CDS: 9E
 2007 album: Koska Olen Hyvä Rouva

Deadbabes
 2003 MCD: The Drug

Iconcrash

 2003 promo: Happy?
 2004 split-EP: Viola loves Iconcrash
 2005 album: Nude
 2008 soundtrack: Clive Barker's Midnight Meat Train
 2008 Mama Trash 2 Compilation
 2008 soundtrack: Blackout
 2009 single: Strange, Strange Dark Star
 2009 single: Everlasting
 2010 single: Sleeper
 2010 album: Enochian Devices
 2011 single: Delete
 2011 single: Stockholm
 2011 album: Inkeroinen
 2012 single: We Are The Night
 2012 album: Inkeroinen (Special edition including: We Are The Night)

Viola
 2004 split-EP: Viola loves Iconcrash
 2005 album: Melancholydisco

Ratas
 2001 MCD: Kuumaa Laavaa
 2002 MCD: Ilmaa

Luomakunta
 2002 album: Alta

Before the Dawn

 2000 promo: To Desire
 2001 MCD: Gehenna
 2002 MCD: My Darkness
 2003 album: My Darkness
 2004 album: 4:14 am
 2005 DVD: The First Chapter

Varjo
 2000 CDS: Korvaamaton
 2000 CDS: Maailmanpyörä
 2000 album: Kuka Korvaa Poistetun Sydämen
 2001 download single: Tänä Kesänä
 2003 album: Paratiisissa
 2009 album: Ensinäytös 1997

Thunderstone

 2009 album: Dirt Metal

Swallow the Sun

 2006 album: Hope
 2006 CDS: Don't Fall Asleep
 2015 triple album: Songs From The North
2018 EP: Lumina Aurea
2019 album: When A Shadow Is Forced Into The Light

Anna Eriksson

 2007 album: Ihode
 2008 album: Annan Vuodet

Scarlet Youth
 2009 MCD: Breaking The Patterns
 2010 album: Goodbye Doesn't Mean I'm Gone

Kwan

 2009 CDS: 10 000 Light Years

Black Sun Aeon

 2009 MCD: Dirty Black Summer EP

Rain Diary

 2010 single: Lost
2012 album: The Lights Are Violent Here
2017 album: Black Weddings

Grendel
 2011 album: Corrupt To The Core

Wiidakko
 2011 single: Seis seis seis
 2011 single: Odessa
 2011 album: Wiidakko

Hevisaurus

2011 album: Räyhällistä Joulua

To/Die/For

 2011 album: Samsara
2014 single: Screaming Birds

Jaani Peuhu
 2013 single: My Sky
 2014 single: No Regrets
 2014 single: Tonight's Music
2014 EP: Echo Chamber
 2015 album: Tear Catcher

Beats and Styles|Beats And Styles

 2017 single: Still Alive

Hallatar

 2017 album: No Stars Upon the Bridge

Lord of the Lost

 2018 album: Thornstar
 2019 album: Till Death Us Do Part – Best Of
 2020 album: Swan Songs III

Aleah
 2020 album: Aleah

References

External links 

 Iconcrash on MySpace
 Iconcrash: Enochian Devices Blog

1978 births
Living people
21st-century Finnish male singers
Finnish songwriters
Musicians from Helsinki